Raimundo Revoredo Ruiz, C.M., (28 December 1927 – 1 December 2021) was a Peruvian Roman Catholic prelate and member of the Congregation of the Mission. He served as the Bishop-Prelate of the Roman Catholic Territorial Prelature of Juli from November 1988 until 29 May 1999.

Revoredo Ruiz was born in Lima, Peru, to Raimundo Revoredo Arana and Mariluz Ruiz Paz on 28 December 1927. He was ordained a Catholic deacon on 22 January 1950, and a Catholic priest on 29 June 1950, both in Tarragona, Spain. Revoredo taught theology at the Seminario de la Congregación in L'Espluga de Francolí from 1952 to 1954. In 1954, he was sent to Brooklyn in New York City, where he served as a parish priest from until 1964. He was transferred back to his native Peru in 1964.

He died in Lima on 1 December 2021, at the age of 94.

References

1927 births
2021 deaths
20th-century Roman Catholic bishops in Peru
Roman Catholic bishops of Juli
Peruvian Roman Catholic bishops
Vincentians
Vincentian bishops
Bishops appointed by Pope John Paul II
Peruvian expatriates in the United States
Peruvian expatriates in Spain
People from Lima
People from Brooklyn